The Military ranks of Bahamas are the military insignia used by the Royal Bahamas Defence Force. Bahamas does not have an army or air force, and the entire defence force is composed of the navy. Being a member of the Commonwealth of Nations, Bahamas shares a rank structure similar to that of the United Kingdom's Royal Navy.

Ranks

Commissioned Officers

Other ranks

References

External links
 
 

Bahamas
Military of the Bahamas